Barium cyanide is a chemical compound with the formula Ba(CN)2. It is synthesized by the reaction of hydrogen cyanide and barium hydroxide in water or petroleum ether. It is a white crystalline salt.

Uses
Barium cyanide is used in electroplating and other metallurgical processes.

Reactions
Barium cyanide reacts with water and carbon dioxide in air slowly, producing highly toxic hydrogen cyanide gas.

When barium cyanide is heated to 300° C with steam present, the nitrogen evolves to ammonia, leaving barium formate. The reaction is Ba(CN)2 + 4H2O = Ba(HCOO)2 + 2NH3.

Aqueous solutions of barium cyanide dissolve insoluble cyanides of some of the heavy metals forming crystalline double salts. For example,  BaHg(CN)4.3H2O in needles, 2Ba(CN)2.3Hg(CN)2.23H2O in transparent octahedra, and Ba(CN)2.Hg(CN)2.HgI2.6H2O.

References

Barium compounds
Cyanides